Hiroko Ishii (born ) is a Japanese female  track cyclist. She competed in the sprint event at the 2012 and 2013 UCI Track Cycling World Championships.

Major results
2014
Japan Track Cup 2
2nd Keirin
2nd Sprint

References

External links
 Profile at cyclingarchives.com

1986 births
Living people
Japanese track cyclists
Japanese female cyclists
Place of birth missing (living people)
20th-century Japanese women
21st-century Japanese women